SIRUM (Supporting Initiatives to Redistribute Unused Medicine) is a non-profit social enterprise started by Stanford University students to decrease the amount of medicine going to waste in the U.S. by redistributing unused, unexpired drugs to safety-net clinics. Using an innovative technology platform, SIRUM saves lives, time, and money by allowing health facilities, manufacturers, wholesalers, and pharmacies to easily donate unused medicine rather than destroy it.

Opportunity
An estimated $5 billion worth of usable medicine goes to waste each year in the United States—yet 50 million Americans report not being able to afford taking their medications as prescribed. Americans’ medication non-adherence results in an estimated 125,000 annual deaths and costs up to $289 billion annually. The act of wasting that $5 billion of usable medicine each year also has consequences for Americans, polluting air and water supplies, and resulting in the duplicative purchasing and manufacturing of drugs to meet patient needs—which could otherwise be met by drawing on that $5 billion medication surplus.

Much of the surplus unused medicine wasted each year resides with healthcare companies and organizations, such as with long-term care facilities, pharmaceutical manufacturers, wholesalers, and pharmacies. Because these surplus medications remain in institutional settings throughout their life cycles, their integrity is carefully maintained by trained healthcare professionals. Patients who cannot afford to purchase the prescriptions they need could greatly benefit from having access to these safe, unexpired, and unopened medications that otherwise go to waste.

Forty states around the country have recently recognized this opportunity and passed so-called “Good Samaritan” laws providing legal protection and regulatory guidelines for the creation of medicine redistribution programs.

Method of operation
SIRUM leverages technology to connect surpluses of unused medicine with safety-net clinics whose low-income patients cannot afford their medicine. Through SIRUM’s first-of-its-kind online platform, donor organizations can upload inventories of their unused medications while safety-net clinics upload their patients’ medication needs. SIRUM’s system then creates automatic matches between donating and recipient parties, and facilitates the speedy and direct shipment of medicine from facility to clinic. SIRUM’s online platform handles record-keeping, shipping, and other logistics. Throughout each step of the process SIRUM aims to make medicine donation an easier, more enticing option than medicine destruction.

Results
As of mid-2014, SIRUM has medicine redistribution networks running in California and Colorado, with over 200 partners participating in total. The organization has facilitated the redistribution of 1 million pills, which amounts to about $3 million worth of drugs saved and 20,000 patients helped. That also represents about two tons of medicine diverted away from our waste streams—and thousands of tons more waste avoided by forgoing the production of the 1 million pills these safety-net clinics would have otherwise had to purchase anew.

Legislation
SIRUM is possible because of two recent legal advancements. One is the enactment of Good Samaritan laws that have passed in 40 states. These laws make it easier for certain types of donors to redistribute unused medicine without liability.

The second legal advancement is a Food and Drug Administration mandate that requires all manufactured medicine to be labeled with the National Drug Code, a consistent coding system that identifies medicine by type, strength, and amount. SIRUM uses these standardized codes to match clinic requests with donor excess. The online system allows for medicine to be entered and requested using the trade name, active ingredient, NDC labeler code, NDC product code, or manufacturer. With all information contained within its database, SIRUM is able to match the needs of its member clinics.

History
Adam Kircher first had the idea for SIRUM in 2005. His experience with relief efforts in post-tsunami Batam, Indonesia alerted him to difficulties in redistributing supplies, including medicine. Adam was inspired to use the internet to create a trusted community for redistributing medicine, and he assembled a group of Stanford students to help achieve his aims. In 2009, SIRUM became incorporated and launched its pilot program in the San Francisco Bay Area. Since then, SIRUM has made its online platform increasingly robust and built out its donation network to include 200 partners across California and Colorado. Its early funders included the California HealthCare Foundation, the Robert Wood Johnson Foundation, and the Draper Richards Kaplan Foundation.

References

External links 
SIRUM - Official website
SIRUM Gets Surplus Meds to the Poor
Creating a Match.com for Unused Medicine
Google-Backed Nonprofit Startups Tackle World’s Toughest Problems
Connecting unused drugs, uninsured patients

Non-profit organizations based in California
Recycling in the United States
Social enterprises
Recycling organizations
501(c)(3) organizations
Y Combinator companies